The Sanford Stakes is an American Thoroughbred horse race held annually during the third week of July at the Saratoga Race Course in Saratoga Springs, New York. A six furlong sprint race, the Grade III event is open to two-year-old horses.

Inaugurated in 1913 as the Sanford Memorial Stakes, it was modified to its present name in 1927. The race is named for Stephen Sanford and his son John, Amsterdam, New York businessmen from one of Saratoga's original horse racing families.  Their horses first appeared in the Saratoga races in 1880. Stephen Sanford named all his best horses after members of the Mohawk nation.

The race was hosted by Belmont Park from 1943 through 1945. It was contested at five and a half furlongs from 1962 through 1968. Held for almost a hundred years, the only three years in which it did not take place was 1961, 2005, and 2020.

Only four horses have ever won all three Saratoga Racecourse events for two-year-olds. Regret (1914), Campfire (1916), Dehere (1993), and City Zip (2000) each swept the Sanford Stakes, Saratoga Special Stakes, and Hopeful Stakes.

It was in the seventh running of the Sanford in 1919 that Man o' War lost his only race to the Harry Payne Whitney colt, Upset.

This race was downgraded to a Grade III for its 2014 running.

Records
Speed record: (at current distance of 6 furlongs)
 1:09.32 – Afleet Alex (2004)

Most wins by a jockey:
 7 – John Velazquez (1999, 2001, 2003, 2006, 2007, 2011, 2015)

Most wins by a Trainer

 8 –Todd A. Pletcher  (1999,  2003, 2006, 2007, 2011, 2015, 2018, 2021)

Most wins by an owner:

 8 – Greentree Stable (1933, 1941, 1950, 1951, 1956, 1959, 1963, 1978)

Winners

* † In 1938, Ariel Toy finished first, but was disqualified. † In 1939 the niece of Edward R. Bradley raced Boy Angler under the nom de course "Mr. French."

References

External links
 The 2009 Sanford Stakes at the NTRA

Horse races in New York (state)
Saratoga Race Course
Flat horse races for two-year-olds
Graded stakes races in the United States
Grade 3 stakes races in the United States
Recurring sporting events established in 1913
Sanford family
1913 establishments in New York (state)